Q-Free ASA is a supplier of Tolling, Parking, Traffic Management and Connected ITS (C-ITS)/Connected Vehicle solutions with headquarters in Trondheim, Norway. The company has approximately 380 employees with 17 offices around the world and has been listed on the Oslo Stock Exchange since 2002 with the ticker QFR.

History
With offices in most European countries, Asia, Australia and Americas, Q-Free sells applications mainly within electronic toll collection for road financing, congestion charging, truck-tolling and parking/access control, and supplies DSRC (Dedicated Short Range Communication) technology, OCR (image processing), ALPR (Automatic License Plate Recognition) and GNSS (Global Navigation Satellite System) based products.

The company was established as Micro Design AS in 1984. In 1988, Q-Free ETC technology was installed in Trondheim and two years later in Oslo, the two systems being the predecessor to the present AutoPASS technology in Norway. The company's first international delivery came in 1995, to Portugal and in 1997, the European standard for Electronic Toll Collection was introduced. In 1998, the company changed its name to Q-Free.

In September 2001, Q-Free bought the cellphone manufacturer MagCom. The new company, named Q-Free MagCom, continued as a separate entity for around a year, after which the production of phones ceased.

References

Companies based in Trondheim
Computer companies of Norway
Electronics companies of Norway
Companies established in 1984